Jim Lee is a record producer, composer and arranger, musician, recording and live audio engineer in Taiwan, Hong Kong and China. He has earned numerous awards during his 30 plus years in the business. He has worked as A&R manager for various international record labels, as well as an independent producer, engineer, musician and composer throughout his career.

Education

University of California at Berkeley: Bachelor of Science degree in Electrical Engineering and Computer Science
加州柏克萊大學: 學士學位-電子工程及電腦科學.

Music Works and Awards

Studio albums
Some of his more noted album production awards are:
Wakin Chau (周華健)Made Me Happy & Sad(讓我歡喜讓我憂): 3rd Annual GMA Producer of the year award
Karen Mok (莫文蔚) Be Yourself (做自己) and I Say albums: Annual Best 10 albums from The Association of Music Workers in Taiwan
Leehom Wang 王力宏Revolution (公轉自轉): 10th annual GMA Best male vocalist and Producer of the year awards, Annual Best 10 albums from The Association of Music Workers in Taiwan
 Sandy Lam Sandy Lam 林憶蓮(林憶蓮) At Least I Have You (至少還有你): Annual Best 10 albums from The Association of Music Workers in Taiwan
Stanley Huang (黃立行) Circus Monkey(馬戲團的猴子): Annual Best 10 albums from The Association of Music Workers in Taiwan
Sandy Lam 林憶蓮2001(2001蓮): Annual Best 10 albums from The Association of Music Workers in Taiwan
Eason Chan (陳奕迅) Special Thanks to…: 14th annual GMA Best male vocalist and Album of the year awardsGMA, Annual Best 10 albums from The Association of Music Workers in Taiwan,
Lisa Hsieh 謝凌君More Lisa: Annual Best 10 albums from The Association of Music Workers in Taiwan
Sandy Lam (林憶蓮) Paper Plane(原本…. 林憶蓮/紙飛機): Annual Best 10 albums from The Association of Music Workers in Taiwan
Eason Chan (陳奕迅) Black, White, Gray(黑白灰): Annual Best 10 albums from The Association of Music Workers in Taiwan
Eason Chan (陳奕迅) Don't Want To Let Go(不想放手): 20th annual GMA Album of the year award, Annual Best 10 albums from The Association of Music Workers in Taiwan
Freya Lim 林凡'Tears-眼淚流回去' 22nd annual GMA best female vocalist nominee
A Mei 張惠妹R U Watching?你在看我嗎? 23rd annual GMA best female vocalist nominee
Adrian Fu 符致逸'Good Morning Hard City' 26th annual GMA best new artist nominee

Recording and Mixing
Noted Recording and Mixing awards are:
Ren Ling Yu OST (阮玲玉電影原聲帶):  Best Recording & Mixing from Golden Melody Award
Jonathan Lee (李宗盛) Cherish (不捨): Best Recording & Mixing from Golden Melody Award

Live Concert Sound Design and FOH Engineer
(* + Music Director / ** + Live Recording)

Year	/		                Artist /					                                            Concert
2018-present                   Jeff Chang (張信哲)       "Continuum - 未來式" * **
2012-2015 Leehom Wang (王力宏) "Music Man 2" World Tour (火力全开)
2010-2012 A Mei (張惠妹) AmeiZing World Tour
2010	       		        MR  					                                                    "Everyone’s Concert"
2009-2010		        A MIT (阿密特)			                                                    "A MIT" World Tour **
2009-2010		        David Tao (陶喆)			                                            "Space Oddity" World Tour
2008-2010		        Leehom Wang (王力宏)		                                            "Music Man" World Tour
2009			        Eason Chan (陳奕迅)			                                            "Moving On"(Encore Taipei)
2009			        Steve Wong/Paul Wong (黃家強/黃貫中)		                    "Rock n Roll" (Hong Kong)
2008-2009		        A Mei (張惠妹)			                                                    "Star" World Tour
2008			        David Tao (陶喆)			                                            "1,2,3" World Tour
2008			        Chung Wei Young (楊宗瑋)		                                    "Star Start" (Taipei) *
2008			        Eason Chan (陳奕迅)			                                            "Moving On" (Taipei)
2007			        Sandy Lam (林憶蓮)			                                            "Come As You Are"  **
2005-2007		        Leehom Wang (王力宏)		                                            "Hero or Earth" World Tour
2005-2007		        David Tao (陶喆)			                                            "Love Can" World Tour
2006			        Sandy Lam (林憶蓮)			                                            "Sandy Lam Concert"  **
2004-2007		        Kelly Chan (陳彗琳)			                                            "Lost in Paradise World Tour"
2004			        Elva/Leehom/Eason/David 		                                    "Hope of Love/愛的希望"  (Taipei) *
2003			        Anita (梅艷方)			                                                    "Anita Classic Moment Live"
2003			        Hui Peng Lin (林彗萍)                                                           "萍水相逢"
2003-2004		        David Tao (陶喆)			                                            "Soul Power" World Tour
2003-2004		        Leehom Wang	 (王力宏)		                                            "王力宏" Asia Tour
2003			        Eason Chan (陳奕迅)			                                            "Third Encounter/第三類接觸"
2002			        Elva Hsiao (蕭亞軒) 			                                            "Up 2 U" Asia Tour
2001			        Elva Hsiao (蕭亞軒) 			                                            "香港夏日的精彩"
2001			        Various Artists			                                                    "RTHK Solar Project/太陽計劃"
2001			        Sandy Lam (林憶蓮)			                                            "2001蓮 Live" (HK)
2001			        Elva Hsiao (蕭亞軒)			                                            "狂熱份子 Live" (HK)
2000			        Elva Hsiao (蕭亞軒)			                                            "夏日薔薇" Asia Tour
2000			        Various Artists			                                                    "RTHK Solar Project/太陽計劃"
2000			        Sandy Lam (林憶蓮)			                                            "至少還有你"  Live *
1999			        Various Artists (8萬人倒數)		                                    "Millennium Countdown Concert" *
1999			        David Tao (陶喆)			                                            "Hong Kong Concert" *
1998			        Beyond				                                                    "新音樂超 Beyond" Live
1998			        CoCo Lee (李玟)			                                            "萬人迷" Concerts *
1996			        Sandy Lam (林憶蓮)			                                            "Love Sandy" Asia Tour
1995			        Emil Chou (周華健)			                                            "天下有情人" Asia Tour
1994			        Chief (趙傳)				                                            "愛我那麼久" Live
1994			        Jonathan Lee(李宗盛)			                                    "李宗盛暫別" Concerts
1994			        Emil Chou (周華健)			                                            "巡弋之旅風雨無阻" Asia Tour
1994			        Jonathan Lee(李宗盛)			                                    "我們都愛宗盛" Concerts
1993			        Alex To (杜德偉)			                                            "橫衝直撞"  Live
1993			        Emil Chou (周華健)			                                            "今夜陽光燦爛"  Asia Tour
1992			        Jonathan Lee(李宗盛)			                                    "大家樂"  Asia Tour
			                Sarah Chan (陳淑樺)
			                Emil Chou (周華健)
			                Chief (趙傳)

References 

Living people
Taiwanese record producers
Year of birth missing (living people)